Church Woods, Blean is a  biological Site of Special Scientific Interest north-west of Canterbury in Kent. It is a Nature Conservation Review site, Grade I, a National Nature Reserve, a Special Area of Conservation and part of it is a Royal Society for the Protection of Birds nature reserve. 

This broadleaved coppice with standards wood has a diverse range of trees, a rich ground flora, a wide variety of birds and many uncommon invertebrates, including the nationally rare heath fritillary butterfly.

There is public access to the site and it is crossed by footpaths.

References

Sites of Special Scientific Interest in Kent
Special Areas of Conservation in England
National nature reserves in England
Nature Conservation Review sites
Forests and woodlands of Kent